The 1984 European Taekwondo Championships were held in Stuttgart, West Germany. The event took place from 26 to 28 October, 1984.

Medal summary

Men

Women

References

External links 
 European Taekwondo Union

1984 in taekwondo
European Taekwondo Championships
International sports competitions hosted by Germany
1984 in European sport
1984 in German sport